Dam removal is the process of demolishing a dam, returning water flow to the river. Arguments for dam removal consider whether their negative effects outweigh their benefits. The benefits of dams include hydropower production, flood control, irrigation, and navigation. Negative effects of dams include environmental degradation, such as reduced primary productivity, loss of biodiversity, and declines in native species; some negative effects worsen as dams age, like structural weakness, reduced safety, sediment accumulation, and high maintenance expense. The rate of dam removals in the United States has increased over time, in part driven by dam age. As of 1996, 5,000 large dams around the world were more than 50 years old. In 2020, 85% percent of dams in the United States are more than 50 years old. In the United States roughly 900 dams were removed between 1990 and 2015, and by 2015, the rate was 50 to 60 per year.  France and Canada have also completed significant removal projects. Japan's first removal, of the Arase Dam on the Kuma River, began in 2012 and was completed in 2017. A number of major dam removal projects have been motivated by environmental goals, particularly restoration of river habitat, native fish, and unique geomorphological features. For example, fish restoration motivated the Elwha Ecosystem Restoration and the dam removal on the river Allier, while recovery of both native fish and of travertine deposition motivated the restoration of Fossil Creek.

Purposes and effects of dams

Many of the dams in the eastern United States were built for water diversion, agriculture, factory watermills, and other purposes that are no longer seen as useful. Because of the age of these dams, over time the risk for catastrophic failure increases. In addition, many of these dams block anadromous fish runs, such as Atlantic salmon and American shad, and prevent important sediments from reaching estuaries.

Many dams in the western United States were built for agricultural water diversion in the arid country, with hydroelectric power generation being a very significant side benefit. Among the largest of these water diversion projects is the Columbia Basin Project, which diverts water at the Grand Coulee Dam. The Bureau of Reclamation manages many of these water diversion projects.

Some dams in the Pacific Northwest and California block passage for anadromous fish species such as Pacific Salmon and steelhead. Fish ladders and other passage facilities have been ineffective in mitigating the negative effects on salmon populations.  

Bonneville Power Administration manages electricity on 11 dams on the Columbia River and 4 on the Snake River, which were built by the Army Corps of Engineers.

In the Desert Southwest, dams can change the nature of the river ecosystem. In the particular case of the Glen Canyon Dam, the originally warm, sediment-filled, muddy water, instead runs cold and clear through the Grand Canyon, which has significant impacts on the downstream ecosystems. Three native fish species have become extinct in the Grand Canyon and others are endangered since the dam was completed, including humpback chub and razorback sucker.

Some dam projects, such as those on the Salt River Project in Arizona, eliminate the flow of the river downstream, by diverting the flow into the Arizona Canal system for use in agriculture and urban usage, such that only a dry channel or arroyo heads out across the desert.

So much water is taken out of the Colorado River for agriculture, urban use, and evaporation behind the dams, that the river no longer flows into the Gulf of California.

Methods of removal 
There are several ways dams can be removed and the chosen method will depend on many factors. The size and type of the dam, the amount of sediment behind the dam, the aquatic environment below the dam, who owns the dam and what their priorities are, and the timeframe of dam removal are all factors that affect how the dam will be removed. Removal is costly no matter what and expenses typically rise when greater weight is given to environmental concerns. Fortunately, the cost of dam removal is usually shared by multiple stakeholders such as the dam owner and either the federal, state or local government. Four of the most common dam removal methods are described below.

Sediment management is a driving force in all of them. A common problem for dams is how sediment carried naturally by the river is deposited in the reservoir and eventually fills it up with silt. This excess sediment reduces the hydroelectric generating capacity of a reservoir, changes the river channel downstream, traps nutrient-rich sediment behind the dam, and can put a dangerous amount of pressure on the dam itself. Oftentimes the sediment stored in a reservoir is good for the riparian corridor below the dam, can rebuild fish habitat, provide nutrients, and add onto a beach or estuary. Other times, the sediment can increase the turbidity of the river harming fish, scour the landscape, and bury infrastructure.

Sediment can be tested before it is released to determine if it will be harmful to the landscape below the dam. Dam removal can have adverse consequences if this is not done. For example, when the Fort Edward Dam on the Hudson River was removed in the 1970s, PCBs in the sediment were released, affecting human and wildlife health downstream.

Notch and release approach 
The notch and release approach is commonly used because of its ecological benefits. It is a slow method in which the reservoir is drained through notches cut into the dam. New notches are cut in so the water drains out of the reservoir at a consistent flow. The sediment trapped behind the dam flows downstream in a fixed rate that allows the ecosystem to adjust to the changes. This method can take months or even over a year but has proven success with restoring fish species to rivers. The Elwha and Glines Canyon dam removal project used the notch and release approach to great success.

Rapid release approach 
The rapid release approach is both the quickest and least expensive way to remove a dam, but comes with significant drawbacks. In this approach, a large tunnel is dug through the base of the dam and then connected to the reservoir. The entire body of water will drain through this tunnel in a matter of minutes or hours and the massive release of water and sediment can cause severe flooding and erosion along the river downstream for miles. This can devastate the riparian ecosystem along the river as well as dangerously scour bridge pilings, buried pipes, levees, and other infrastructure. However, if the reservoir held back by the dam is relatively small and quickly drains into a larger river or lake, this approach can be carried out with minimal impact on either the ecosystem or human infrastructure.

Dig and dewater approach 
The dig and dewater approach is typically the most expensive dam removal method, but is necessary in some cases. It entails emptying the entire reservoir, allowing the sediment to dry, and then transporting it to a safe location for disposal. It is costly and slow, but if the reservoir is located very near hydroelectric generating facilities that would be greatly impacted by released sediments, it may be necessary. Another situation is if the sediments behind the dam contain toxins. Hauling them away and disposing of them safely is important for the ecological health of the river.

Retained sediment approach 
The retained sediment approach is the final commonly used approach and involves leaving the sediment behind where it is. To do this, the river or creek must be rerouted around the damsite which can prove expensive and challenging. This may be carried out in places where the dig and dewater approach makes sense, but are too remote to be cost-effective.

Alternatives to removal 

While fewer than 1% of United States dams are being considered for removal, there has been a push in recent years to address the deficiencies in existing dams without removing them. These goals include maximizing the efficiency of existing dams and minimizing their environmental impact. Updating equipment and acknowledging that dams have a limited life span are two ways to achieve those goals. As part of them, a plan for decommissioning the dam and restoring the river should be drawn up long before the dam exceeds its design life.

One part of river restoration that does not have to wait until the dam is removed is introducing environmental flow. Having variable amounts of water flow through the dam at different seasons mimics natural seasonal variations in water level from winter and spring storms. Additionally, fish ladders can be added to dams to increase the connectivity of a river and allow fish to reach their spawning grounds. There's debate about the effectiveness of fish ladders, but generally some fish will make it through as opposed to zero fish spawning in their traditional location.

Reservoir sedimentation can also be countered using specific dam management strategies.

Completed projects

United States

Proposed removals in USA

Lower Snake River Dams, Washington, US

Four dams along the lower Snake River, built and still operated by the United States Army Corps of Engineers, serve as hydroelectric power sources as well as maintaining an inland port at Lewiston, Idaho for agricultural barge traffic.  The four are candidates for removal because of millions of cubic yards accumulated behind the dams, which are raising water levels for riverside cities.  They include:  the 1975  Lower Granite Dam, the 1970  Little Goose Dam, the 1969  Lower Monumental Dam, and the 1962  Ice Harbor Dam.

Three million new cubic yards of sediment are deposited behind the lower four dams on the Snake River annually.  The city of Lewiston, Idaho and others along the Snake have built a system of levees maintained by the Army Corps of Engineers. The levees in Lewiston were designed to leave five feet between water levels and the top of the levees.  As of 2011, two feet remained.  As water levels continue to rise, either some of the dams must be removed or dredged, or the municipal levees will continue to be raised.  The Corps admits that the amount of sediment in the riverbed is too great for dredging to be effective, and Lewiston community leaders are worried that higher levees will further cut the town off from its rivers.

The Corps began dredging behind Lower Granite Dam in 2015.

Rindge Dam and Matilija Dam, Southern California

The  privately owned Rindge Dam on Malibu Creek in the Santa Monica Mountains of California was built in 1924 and has been allowed to completely fill with sediment, making it functionally obsolete but still a potential hazard.  Malibu Creek once supported the southernmost steelhead population in the world. But today, steelhead no longer occupy the creek.

The similar 1947 Matilija Dam near Ojai, California was built against the advice of the U.S. Army Corps of Engineers, among others, and also blocked steelhead trout spawning grounds.  After being notched twice and largely silted up, 90% of its design capacity has been lost.  As of 2013 stakeholders agree that the dam and its sediment be removed, but no funding source has been identified.

Klamath River Dams, California / Oregon border

As resolution of several long-range issues centered on water rights in the Klamath Basin, the multi-party Klamath Basin Restoration Agreement was signed in early 2008.  Parties to the agreement included the state of California, the state of Oregon, three Native American tribes, four counties, and 35 other local organizations and individuals.

This agreement called for the removal of four of the Klamath River Hydroelectric Project dams: the 1958 John C. Boyle Dam, the 1922 Copco Number 1 and Copco Number 2, and the 1964 Iron Gate Dam.  All four are privately owned by PacifiCorp.  At the time PacifiCorp faced a relicensing cycle with Federal Energy Regulatory Commission, with potentially expensive fixes for salmon passage and to address the growth of the toxic bacteria Microcystis aeruginosa in the Copco and Iron Gate Reservoirs.

On September 29, 2009, Pacificorp reached an agreement in principle with the other KBRA parties to remove the four dams, pending Congressional approval.

Congress did not act, so as of February 2016, the states of Oregon and California, the dam owners, federal regulators and other parties reached a further agreement to remove all four Klamath basin dams by the year 2020, contingent only on approval by the Federal Energy Regulatory Commission. The new plan has been endorsed by the governors of California and Oregon, as well as the U.S. Secretary of the Interior.

Glen Canyon Dam, northern Arizona 

The  Glen Canyon Dam has been proposed for removal because of the negative effects it has on the water quality and riparian habitat of the Colorado River in Grand Canyon National Park.

The reservoir also loses more than 6 percent of the total annual flow of the Colorado River to evaporation and seepage. Advocates of dam removal such as the Glen Canyon Institute also cite these losses of stored water as reason to decommission the dam.   If it were to be removed, it would dwarf any completed dam removal project in history.

O'Shaughnessy (Hetch Hetchy) Dam, California

O'Shaughnessy Dam in California was completed in 1923 and represented the first great environmental controversy in the US as it was constructed in a national park. The debate over the dam and reservoir continues today. Preservationist groups such as the Sierra Club lobby for the restoration of the valley, while others argue that leaving the dam in place would be the better economic and environmental decision.

Kinnickinnic River Dams, Wisconsin 

The two remaining dams on the Kinnickinnic River in River Falls, Wisconsin are being considered for removal in order to completely restore the Kinnickinnic River to its natural state. The Kinnickinnic River, called the Kinni for short, is a  river in northwestern Wisconsin in the United States.  The Kinni is a cold water fishery supporting a population of native Brook Trout and naturally reproducing Brown Trout. The Kinnickinnic River is officially designated as a Class I trout stream by the WI DNR, indicating it is a "high quality" trout water that has sufficient natural reproduction to sustain populations of wild trout, at or near carrying capacity.  The Kinnickinnic is also designated as an Outstanding Resource Water (ORW) by the WI DNR both above State HWY 35, and below the Powell Falls Dam, however, the stretch of the Kinni through the City of River Falls is not included in this designation where the river is impounded into two reservoirs which do not support a fishery.  This ORW designation indicates the Kinni provides outstanding recreational opportunities, supports valuable fisheries and wildlife habitat, has good water quality, and is not significantly impacted by human activities.  This designation indicates that the State of Wisconsin has determined the Kinnickinnic River warrants additional protection from the effects of pollution. These designations are intended to meet federal Clean Water Act obligations requiring Wisconsin to adopt an “antidegradation” policy that is designed to prevent any lowering of water quality – especially in those waters having significant ecological or cultural value.

Local stakeholder organizations in the FERC relicensing process include the Friends of the Kinni, the Kiap-TU-Wish Chapter of Trout Unlimited, the Kinnickinnic River Land Trust, and the River Alliance of Wisconsin. Government agencies also serving as stakeholder organizations include the Wisconsin DNR, the US Fish and Wildlife Service, and the National Park Service.

See also
Dam failure
Environmental impact of reservoirs
Riparian zone restoration
DamNation
Dam Removal Europe

References

External links

 American Rivers - Dam Removals Interactive Map
 Dam Removal Success Stories - American Rivers
 The Friends of the Kinni
 Exploring Dam Removal: A Decision Making Guide
 Small Dam Removal in Oregon
 US Army Corps of Engineers: Engineering and Ecological Aspects of Dam Removal—An Overview
 Beyond Dams: Options and Alternatives
 Dam Removal: A New Option for a New Century
 Dam Removal Research: Status and Prospectus
 Elwha River Dam Removal Study
 Dam Removal Success Stories:Restoring Rivers through Selective Removal of Dams that Don't Make Sense
 Portland General Electric Marmot Dam
 Army Corps of Engineers Dam Removal Page
 Friends of the Earth River Restoration Page
 Natural Resources Council of Maine Kennebec River Restoration
Spot.us - Story: The Story Behind the World's Biggest Dam Removal - Rough Water

Dams
Demolition
Environmental issues with water
Environmental impact of the energy industry
Ecological restoration